Justice Kan Singh Parihar (30 August 1913 – 28 October 2011) was a Judge of Rajasthan High Court and Vice Chancellor of University of Jodhpur.

Early life and education
Parihar was born on 30 August 1913 on Janmastami in Soorsagar, Jodhpur, Rajasthan, India. When he was six years old his father Shri Chhog Singh Ji Parihar died in 1919 and he was raised by his mother Smt. Murali Devi ji. Parihar had his primary education in Soorsagar. In year 1928 he joined Darbar High School. He completed his BA from Jaswant College, Jodhpur in 1933. In 1936 he received his law (LL.B.) degree from Banaras Hindu University and obtained first division.

Professional life

In year 1936, he joined the bar at Jodhpur and joined a law practice with Sardar Shri Amolak Singh, a senior criminal lawyer. At the age of 23 he was the first lawyer from the all Kisan community of Marwar. In early 1938 he established his legal practice in Nagaur, Rajasthan. After practising successfully at Nagaur for seven years, he joined Marwar State Judicial Service in 1944 as Hakim (Judge). Subsequently, he was appointed as Legal Remembrancer in the Marwar State's Law Department at Jodhpur. While working on this position he drafted Marwar Tenancy Act. 1949 and Marwar Land Revenue Act. 1949. The Acts declared all tenants in cultivatory possession as Khatedars (Land owners). In the newly created State of Rajasthan Parihar was appointed as a Legal Remembrancer in the Law Department of Rajasthan. In 1953 he was appointed Government Advocate at Rajasthan High Court. He was later designated a Senior Advocate in the Supreme Court of India. He was elected unanimously president of Rajasthan Advocates Bar Association in 1962. In August 1964, he was elevated to the bench of the Rajasthan High Court where he served as justice for 11 years until his retirement in August 1975.
After his retirement, Parihar was offered the Chairmanship of National Tribunal at Jabalpur. He was also offered Chairmanship of Monopolies Trade Commission at New Delhi by the Prime Minister of India Indira Gandhi.
In 1977 he was appointed Chairman of Emergency Excesses Inquiry Commission (The Kan Singh Commission) by the Rajasthan Government and again in 1979 he was appointed Vice Chancellor of University of Jodhpur (now Jai Narain Vyas University).

Public life
 After retirement, Parihar worked with various social, educational and religious institutions in Jodhpur. Parihar has been patron and president of many organisations such as Lions Club of Jodhpur West (He was founder president of Lions Club Jodhpur 1967), Jodhana (Citizen's Council of Jodhpur), Veer Durga Das Samiti, Bhartiya Vidhya Bhawan, Mental Hospital Jodhpur. He has also been associated with Than Chand Mehta Trust, Jagdish Singh Gehlot Research Institute, Gita Bhawan Jodhpur (He was president of Gita Bhawan for 17 years from 1975 to 1992), Vishva Sanskrit Pratisthan, Lord Shiva Temple at Umaid Park and Shiksha Prachar Sangh.
 In August 1989, the citizens of Jodhpur organised a grand felicitation function to honour Parihar for his lifelong achievements and exemplary services to the society. The function was presided over by Gaj Singh Ji Maharaja of Jodhpur. Dr. L. M. Singhvi, former high commissioner to the United Kingdom and a jurist, was the chief guest. Parihar was bestowed with a title of "Vidhi Ratnaker" (The Jewel of Law) and a commemoration volume was published in his honour. He was very fluent in English, Sanskrit, Hindi, Marwari and some other languages, but he was always advocating for Marwari (Rajasthani) language since 1950.

References

External links
 https://web.archive.org/web/20090204172331/http://www.justicekansingh.org/
 http://hcraj.nic.in/formerjphoto.htm
 http://www.mapsofindia.com/maps/rajasthan/government-politics/judiciary.html
 http://www.ebc-india.com/lawyer/articles/72v2a6.htm

1913 births
2011 deaths
20th-century Indian judges
20th-century Indian lawyers
Rajasthani people
Rajasthani politicians
People from Jodhpur
Judges of the Rajasthan High Court